Jagiroad is a town in the state of Assam. Jagiroad located in Mayong Sub-Division, in Morigaon  district. It is situated on the south bank of Kolong river.

Etymology
It was earlier known as Nakhola, but in British Rule of India, due to frequent confusion with the name Noakhali of Bangladesh, it was changed to Jagiroad because the road to Jagi, a place in Morigaon, passes through this place.

In ancient times, there was a war with the Kacharis and Jongal Balhu. He was defeated and forced to retreat. The place where he stopped to drink the water of the Kalang, later became known as Raha. The place where he jumped into the Kalang and escaped is called Jagi. And thus, the place known as Jagiroad.

Another theory suggests that the name may have originated from the word Jaglau, which means impossible or improbable in Dimasa Language. This theory is based on the belief that the area was once known for its cultural and intellectual activities, and the name Jagiroad may have been a reflection of this. Regardless of the origin, the name Jagiroad has become an integral part of the town's identity and history.

Geography
Jagiroad is a town located in the Morigaon district of Assam, India. It is situated on the southern bank of the Brahmaputra River, approximately 55 kilometers east of the city of Guwahati.

The town has an elevation of around 52 meters above sea level and is situated in a region that is characterized by low hills and valleys. The area is part of the Brahmaputra Valley, which is known for its fertile alluvial soil and is one of the most productive agricultural regions in the country.

The town is well-connected by road and rail to other parts of the state, with National Highway 27 passing through it. The nearest airport is Lokpriya Gopinath Bordoloi International Airport in Guwahati, which is approximately 60 kilometers away.

The Brahmaputra River, which is one of the largest rivers in the world, plays a significant role in the town's geography and economy. The river provides water for irrigation and is used for transportation of goods and people. The river is also a popular tourist attraction, with several cruises and river tours available for visitors.

History
The town has a rich history that dates back to ancient times. The area was once inhabited by various tribes and communities, including the Tiwas, the Kacharis, and the Karbis. In the medieval period, Jagiroad was part of the Tiwa kingdom, which was ruled by the Tiwa dynasty.

The writing of Bhimsingh throws some light on the history of present Morigaon town and its adjoining areas. This region was ruled independently by six rulers. During this time two princes from Darrang, Supradhvaj and Makardhvaj, fled from their homeland due to internal clash, by crossing the mighty Brahmaputra and they settled at Bahakajari. Later on, Supradhvaj married the daughter of Mangalsingh, the King of Baghara. Supradhvaj was then made the seventh king of the region, having an independent kingdom of his own.

During the colonial period, Jagiroad was an important center for tea cultivation and trade. The British established several tea gardens in the area, which led to the growth of a tea-based economy. In addition to tea, the area was also known for its jute and silk industries.

Jagiroad also played an important role in the Assam Movement, which was a popular movement in the 1970s and 1980s that sought to protect the rights of the indigenous people of Assam. The town was a center of protests and demonstrations during this period.

Demographics
 India census, Jagiroad had a population of 17,739. Males constitute 52% of the population and females 48%. As of 2011 census there are 920 females per 1000 male in the census town. Jagiroad has an average literacy rate of 87%, male literacy is 91%, and female literacy is 74%. In Jagiroad, 10.3% of the population is under six years of age.

Total geographical area of Jagiroad census town is 12 km2, and it is the biggest census town by area in the sub district. Population density of the census town is 1431 persons per km2. There is only one ward in this census town which is Jagiroad Ward No 01.

Nearest railway station is Jagiroad which is within the census town. Mayong is the sub district headquarter and the distance from the census town is 8 km. District headquarters of the census town is Morigoan which is 25 km away. Dispur (Guwahati) is the state headquarters of the census town and is 65 km from here. Yearly average rainfall of the census town is 1399 mm. Maximum temperature here reaches up to 33 °C and minimum temperature goes down to 9 °C.

Jagiroad has 37% (6485) population engaged in either main or marginal works. 60% male and 11% female population are working population. 55% of total male population are main (full-time) workers and 5% are marginal (part-time) workers. For women 7% of total female population are main and 4% are marginal workers.

Language

Bengali is the most spoken language at 8,217 speakers, followed by Assamese at 6,112, Hindi is spoken by 2,392  people, Tiwa (Lalung) at 433 and Nepali at 269.

Politics
Jagiroad is part of Nowgong (Lok Sabha constituency).

Transport

Road
National Highway 27 , an East - West National highway in India that starts in Porbandar and ends in Silchar. It passes through the Jagiroad and link the capital Guwahati with Jagiroad. Jagiroad also connected with Morigaon by Morigaon Road.

Meghalaya Chief Minister Conrad Sangma, recently laid the foundation stone for the Umsning-Jagiroad highway.The Umsning to Jagiroad Highway is a major highway road starting from the 51 km of NH-6 at Umsning and ends at Umsiang village at the Assam–Meghalaya border having a total length of 80 km. The upgradation of above mentioned road is under Meghalaya Integrated Transport Project(MITP) and funded by World Bank.

Rail
Jagiroad has also a railway station named Jagiroad Railway Station.

The Guwahati-Lumding line of Indian Railway passes through Jagiroad Railway Station. Many intercity and passenger trains have stoppage in this station.

Industry
Jagiroad, located in the Morigaon district of Assam, is primarily known for its industrial activities. The Nagaon Paper Mill, which was one of the largest units of the Hindustan Paper Corporation, was situated in Jagiroad. The town also has several other small and medium-sized industries, including plywood factories, sugar mills, and a railway carriage and wagon workshop. In addition, there are several small-scale agro-based industries, such as rice mills and oil mills, that cater to the local agricultural produce. Overall, Jagiroad's industrial sector plays a significant role in the region's economic development and provides employment opportunities for many people.

1000 TPD Cement grinding Unit - Alsthom Industries Limited (Subsidiary of Dalmia Cement Bharat Limited) was established in 2016 which is situated at Baghjap, Jagibhakatgaon in Jagiroad-Marigaon Road. It produces Cements with different grades and supplies across the states and also exports.

Education

Colleges
 Jagiroad College
 Jagiroad Junior College
 Ray Junior College

High schools

 Bapuji High School
 Jagiroad Higher Secondary School (10+2)
 N. F. Railway High School.(10)
 Indus Academy
 Nalanda Academy
 Sahid Lakhi Deka Higher Secondary School
 Jyotiniwas High School, Nizarapar (Jagiroad)
 Kendriya Vidyalaya, Jagiroad(10+2)
 Shankardev Vidya Niketan, Jagiroad 
 Jagiroad Girl's High School 
 HPC High School

Lower primary schools (Prathamik Vidyalaya)
These schools provide education up to standard for:

 Jagiroad Hindi Prathmic Vidyalaya
 Ghunusa Habi Prathamik Vidyalaya
 Nokhula Grant Prathamik Vidyalaya
 Bishnu Rava Nimna Buniyadi Prathamik Vidyalaya
 Tarak Chandra Prathamik Vidyalaya
 Indira Nagar Prathamik Vidyalaya
 Bhanu bidya mandir
 Century Play School
 Bachpan Pre-School
 Kidzee
 Tegheria L.P. School
 Guripathar L.P. School
 Markang Kuchi L.P. School

Nagaon Paper Mill
The Nagaon Paper Mill (NPM) was established in 1970. A unit of Hindustan Paper Corporation Ltd. which is situated on the National Highway 37 at Kagajnagar in Jagiroad. It is the first paper mill in the world to produce Kraft pulp in Kamyr Continuous Digester with 100% bamboo as raw material.

The Nagaon Paper Mill in Jagiroad, which is located approximately 55 km east of Guwahati, was one of two large HPC units that ceased operations due to its inability to pay its employees' salaries since 2017.The Assam Government purchased the assets of the unit, as well as those of the Cachar Paper Mill in the Barak Valley's Panchgram, for a sum of ₹375 crore.

The Assam Government has acquired more than 550 acres of the Hindustan Paper Corporation's locked mill, and plans to transform it into a business-oriented satellite township of Guwahati. The satellite townships would help ease the pressure on Guwahati, where the population has crossed an estimated 12 lakh.

Tourist places
 Baghara : A beautiful but sad legend of the bride of the Baghara Mountains This is the first time I've seen a guy with a smile on his face. I've seen a guy with a smile on his face There are many reasons why you shouldn't buy these products. These are the reasons why you shouldn't buy these products. These are the reasons why you shouldn't buy these products. These are the reasons why you shouldn't buy these products Legend has it that the crying rolls of the unfortunate disembodied bride and the musical instruments used at the wedding have been witnesses to this tragic accident for centuries.

 Sita Jakhala : Sita Jakhala is a small village located near the Brahmaputra River and is known for its scenic beauty and peaceful surroundings. The village is home to a famous temple dedicated to Lord Shiva, which is visited by devotees from across the region. The nearest town to Sita Jakhala is Jagiroad, which is approximately 25 kilometers to the west.

 Mayong : Mayong is a small village located about 20 kilometers from Jagiroad. It is known for its association with magic and witchcraft and is a popular tourist destination in the region.

 Pobitora Wildlife Sanctuary : Pobitora Wildlife Sanctuary is located approximately 50 kilometers from Jagiroad and is home to the Indian one-horned rhinoceros. The sanctuary is also home to other wildlife such as tigers, elephants, and wild buffaloes.

References

Cities and towns in Morigaon district
Morigaon